Henri Djikoloum (born 6 April 1984) is a Chadian professional football player. He has made one appearance for the Chad national football team.

See also
 List of Chad international footballers

References

External links
 

1984 births
Living people
Chadian footballers
Chad international footballers
Place of birth missing (living people)
Association football forwards